Ella Connolly (born 13 July 2000) is an Australian sprinter. She competed in the women's 4 × 400 metres relay at the 2017 World Championships in Athletics.

References

External links

2000 births
Living people
Australian female sprinters
World Athletics Championships athletes for Australia
Place of birth missing (living people)